Andronikos Angelos can refer to:

 Andronikos Doukas Angelos (c. 1133 – before 1185), Byzantine aristocrat, father of emperors Alexios III and Isaac II
 Andronikos Angelos Palaiologos (1282–1328), Byzantine military commander